Nancy Ann Neudauer is an American mathematician specializing in matroid theory and known for her work in mathematical outreach in Africa and South America. She is a professor of mathematics at Pacific University, a co-director of the Center for Undergraduate Research in Mathematics, and a former governor of the Pacific Northwest Section of the Mathematical Association of America.

Education
Neudauer grew up in Milwaukee. She was an undergraduate business student at the University of Wisconsin, where she graduated with a double major in actuarial science and in Wisconsin's program in risk management and insurance. After originally planning to go from there to law school, she stayed at Wisconsin for a master's degree and PhD in mathematics. Her 1998 doctoral dissertation, The Transversal Presentations and Graphs of Bicircular Matroids, was supervised by Richard A. Brualdi.

Service
Neudauer has been funded by the Simons Foundation, and multiple times by the Fulbright Program, to promote mathematics in Africa and South America by traveling there to teach students graduate-level mathematics, with the goal of better preparing them for graduate study abroad. Her work in Africa has also included helping to develop support networks for women in mathematics there.

Neudauer was governor of the Pacific Northwest Section of the Mathematical Association of America from 2006 to 2009. She is a co-director of the Center for Undergraduate Research in Mathematics.

Research

Neudauer has published over 15 research articles on subjects including matroids and lattice chains.

Recognition
In 2010 the Pacific Northwest Section gave Neudauer their annual Award for Distinguished College or University Teaching of Mathematics.

Outreach

Neudauer is known for her outreach work across America and Africa, receiving multiple Fulbright awards for her work supporting the African Institute for Mathematical Sciences. She featured in a short YouTube video on Lifelong Learning.

References

Year of birth missing (living people)
Living people
People from Milwaukee
21st-century American mathematicians
American women mathematicians
Wisconsin School of Business alumni
Pacific University faculty
21st-century women mathematicians
Mathematicians from Wisconsin
21st-century American women